The Deluxtone Rockets is an American band from Muskegon, Michigan. It began as a punk band, but by the time of signing to Tooth & Nail Records it had evolved into a swing revival outfit.

Their first album, which was self-titled, was produced by Gene Eugene and Dennis Danell. They wrote their own songs, and their musical style and lyrics were often compared to The W's, but John Brown's lead vocals were likened to The Mighty Mighty Bosstones' Dicky Barrett or The Reverend Horton Heat.

In their second album, Green Room Blues, the group dropped the horn section entirely and shifted to a rockabilly sound. The album's title reflects the fact that both Eugene and Danell died in early 2000, during production of the album. Though Danell had not been involved in the production, Eugene had been, and was replaced by Chris Colbert. The album has a darker mood than their debut effort, though its lyrics still reflect the faith of John Brown. The album also contained a cover of The Cure's "Lovesong".

2000 was generally reported as a bad year for the band; they were unable to play shows regularly because in addition to recording difficulties, their drummer left, after wanting to move to a different style musically. They were able to get Rodney from the Calicoes to fill in occasionally, and thus played at Cornerstone and other festivals. Also, one night their van caught fire and was totaled, though they still managed to play that night.

Discography
 1999 The Deluxtone Rockets
 1999 Happy Christmas Volume 2 (Compilation, BEC)
 2001 Green Room Blues
 2009 New Material Demo

Band members

1999
 John Brown - Lead Vocals, Guitar
 Jimmy Van Boxel - Upright Bass, BGV's
 Jacob Dykema - Tenor Sax, Vocals
 Richard Mittwede - Trombone, BGV's
 Jason Sorn - Drums
 Tim Harvell - Trumpet, BGV's

2001
 John Brown
 Jimmy Van Boxel
 Lonnie Pease - guitar
 Jason Feltman

2008
 John Brown - Lead Vocals, Guitar
 Jason Sorn - Drums
 Harley Obzut - Bass
 Dusty Bottoms - Guitar

References

External links
[ The Deluxtone Rockets] at Allmusic



American Christian musical groups
Swing revival ensembles
American swing musical groups
Tooth & Nail Records artists
Musical groups from Michigan
Muskegon, Michigan
Rockabilly music groups
Musical groups established in 1996
1996 establishments in Michigan